Sir Arthur Henry Hugh Cortazzi,  (2 May 1924 – 14 August 2018) was a British diplomat. He was also a  distinguished international businessman, academic, author and prominent Japanologist. He was Ambassador from the United Kingdom to Japan (1980–84), President of the Asiatic Society of Japan (1982–1983) and Chairman of the Japan Society of London (1985–95).

Early life
Cortazzi was educated at Sedbergh School, St Andrews University and University of London. He served in the Royal Air Force from 1943 to 1947, serving in Britain and India, and later elsewhere in Asia. He began in the RAF as an Aircraftman 2nd Class and was assigned to a six-month crash course in Japanese, taught at the School of Oriental and African Studies. After completion of the course Cortazzi was sent out to India to the headquarters of the Combined Services Detailed Interrogation Centre in Delhi just as the war was coming to an end. He as assigned to Number 5 Mobile Section but was then posted to Singapore as the personal interpreter of General Miles Dempsey, the commander of the 14th Army. In 1946 he conducted many interrogations and produced translations of wartime documents in Singapore. In June 1946, he was posted to the British Commonwealth Air Contingent of the British Commonwealth Occupation Force and was based in Iwakuni. There he considered that the tasks he was given to undertake were of little value. Cortazzi was granted a wartime commission in the rank of Pilot Officer in June 1945. He was promoted to Flying Officer in December 1945, and left the service in 1947, after which he joined the Foreign Office. In 1998 Cortazzi published his autobiography, Japan and Back, and Places Elsewhere.

Diplomatic career
After the War, the British Foreign Office posted Cortazzi to Singapore (1950–1951) and to Tokyo (1951–1954). After returning to Whitehall (1954–1958), he was posted to Bonn (1958–1960).  Another stint in Tokyo (1961–1965) preceded his return to London (1965–1966). Another posting in Tokyo (1966–1970) was followed by a different kind of opportunity at the Royal College of Defence Studies (1971–1972), after which he was posted to Washington, D.C. (1972–1975).

In 1975, Cortazzi was appointed Deputy Under-Secretary of State. The next few years in the Foreign and Commonwealth Office (1975–1980) preceded his appointment as Her Majesty's Ambassador to Japan in 1980. In 1980, Sir Hugh was elevated to the rank of Knight Commander the Most Distinguished Order of St Michael and St George. He spent the next four years in Tokyo.

Businessman
Sir Hugh retired from public service after his years as British ambassador to Japan, but in private life, he has continued to work promoting better Anglo-Japanese relations. In addition to the books he has since written or edited, he has regularly carved out time to write reviews and a recurring column in the Japan Times.

In 2006, Sir Hugh's translation of the Japanese Crown Prince Naruhito's account of his time at Oxford was published as The Thames and I.

Sir Hugh diversified his experiences with time spent as a Director of Hill Samuel & Co., later Hill Samuel Bank (1984–1991). He has been a Director of Director: Foreign and Colonial Pacific Trust since 1984; a Director of GT Japan Investment Trust since 1984; and a Director of Thornton Pacific (formerly Pacific) Investment Trust since 1986. Since 1992 he has served as Senior Adviser to a number of Japanese multi-national businesses with significant interests in the United Kingdom—such as, NEC Corporation, Dai-ichi Kangyo Bank, Bank of Kyoto.

Sir Hugh was a member of the Economic and Social Research Council (1984–1989); a member of the Council and Court, University of Sussex (1985–1992); and Honorary Fellow of Robinson College, University of Cambridge, (1988).

He died on 14 August 2018 at the age of 94.

Honours
 University of Stirling, Honorary doctorate, 1988.
 Order of the Sacred Treasure, Grand Cordon (Japan), 1995.
 Companion of the Order of St Michael and St George (CMG), 1969.
 Knight Commander of the Order of St Michael and St George (KCMG), 1980.
 Knight Grand Cross of the Order of St Michael and St George (GCMG), 1984.

Selected works
Sir Hugh has written, edited, translated or contributed to a number of books on the history of Anglo-Japanese relations, and Japanese history or culture. He has also written articles on Japanese themes in English and Japanese publications.

In a statistical overview derived from writings by and about Hugh Cortazzi, OCLC/WorldCat encompasses roughly 60+ works in 100+ publications in 4 languages and 4,000+ library holdings.

2009 – Japan in Late Victorian London: The Japanese Native Village in Knightsbridge and 'The Mikado', 1885, Sainsbury Institute, 2009 
 2009 – Introduction to A Diplomat in Japan Part II: The Diaries of Sir Ernest Satow, 1870-1883, lulu.com
 2007 – Britain & Japan: Biographical Portraits, vol. VI.  Folkestone, Kent: Global Oriental. [reprinted by University of Hawaii Press, Honolulu, 2007.  (cloth)]
 2005 – Britain & Japan: Biographical Portraits, vol. V. Folkestone, Kent: Global Oriental.  (cloth)
 2003 – Britain & Japan: Biographical Portraits, vol. IV. London: Curzon.   (Cloth)
 2001 – British Envoys in Japan, 1859–1972. Folkestone, Kent: Japan Library. .
 2001 – Japan Experiences : Fifty Years, One Hundred Views Post-War Japan Through British Eyes, 1945-2000, Folkestone Kent: Japan Library.  (cloth)
 2000 – Collected Writings of Sir Hugh Cortazzi, vol. II; London: Routledge.  (cloth)
 1998 – Japan and Back and Places Elsewhere [reprinted University of Hawaii Press, Honolulu, 2000;  (cloth)]
 1995 – Caught in Time: Japan (with Terry Bennett). Boston: Weatherhill;  (cloth)
 1994 – Japan. New York: Paul & Co. Publishers Consortium; 
 1993 – Modern Japan: a concise survey [reprinted by Palgrave MacMillan, Basingstoke, Hampshire, 2006;  (paper)]
 1992 – Britain and Japan 1859-1991: Themes and Personalities (with Gordon Daniels). London: Routledge;  (cloth)
 1990 – The Japanese Achievement: a short history of Japan and Japanese culture. London: Sidgwick & Jackson;  [reprinted by Palgrave MacMillan, Basingstoke, Hampshire: 1990;  (cloth)]
 1988 – Kipling's Japan, (with George Webb); London: Continuum International;  (cloth)
 1987 – Victorians in Japan: in and around the Treaty Ports, London: Continuum International;  (cloth)
 1987 – Japanese Encounter, Tokyo: Eichosha Shinsha
 1987 – Zoku, Higashi no Shimaguni, Nishi no Shimaguni
 1986 – Second Thoughts (essays). Tokyo: Eichosha Shinsha
 1985 – Dr. Willis in Japan, 1862–1877: British Medical Pioneer, London: Athlone Press/ Continuum International;  (cloth)
 1984 – Higashi No Shimaguni, Nishi No Shimaguni (collection of articles and speeches in Japanese)
 1984 – For Japanese students of English: Thoughts from a Sussex Garden (essays), Tokyo: Eichosha Shinsha
 1983 –  Isle of Gold: Antique Maps of Japan Boston: Weatherhill;  (cloth)
 1980 – The Lucky One and Other Humorous Stories
 1972 – The Guardian God of Golf and other humorous stories [reprinted as The Lucky One, 1980]

Editor
 2004 – Hiro no Miya Naruhito. The Thames and I: A Memoir Of Two Years At Oxford (tr., Hugh Cortazzi). Folkestone, Kent: Global Oriental.
 2000 – Shillony, Ben-Ami. Collected Writings of Ben-Ami Shillony (eds., Carmen Blacker and Hugh Cortazzi). London: Routledge;  (cloth)
 1991 – East, Sir Alfred.  A British Artist in Meiji Japan (ed., Hugh Cortazzi) - reprinted by Weatherhill, Boston, 1997.  (cloth)]
 1991 – Brunton, Richard Henry. Building Japan, 1868–1876 (ed., Hugh Cortazzi). Folkestone Kent: Japan Library;  (cloth)
 1985 – Algernon Bertram Freeman-Mitford. Mitford's Japan: Memories and Recollections, 1866-1906 (ed., Hugh Cortazzi). London: Athlone Press/Continuum International;  (cloth)) [reprinted by Global Oriental, Folkestone, Kent, 2003;  (paper)]
 1982 – Fraser, Mary Crawford Fraser. A Diplomat's Wife in Japan: Sketches at the Turn of the Century (ed., Hugh Cortazzi). Boston: Weatherhill;  (cloth)
 1972 – Keita Genji. The Ogre and other stories of the Japanese Salarymen (tr., Hugh Cortazzi). Tokyo: Japan Times.

Notes

See also
 Heads of the United Kingdom Mission in Japan
 Anglo-Japanese relations
 Global Oriental—Cortazzi on publisher's Advisory Board

References
 Cortazzi, Hugh. "A Japanese sense of humor?", Japan Times. 27 March 2007.
  "Birthdays: Hugh Cortazzi",  Times of London. 2 May 2006.

External links
 Books by Hugh Cortazzi
 Japan Society

1924 births
2018 deaths
People from Sedbergh
People educated at Sedbergh School
Alumni of SOAS University of London
Ambassadors of the United Kingdom to Japan
English people of Italian descent
British Japanologists
Knights Grand Cross of the Order of St Michael and St George
Recipients of the Order of the Sacred Treasure, 1st class
Royal Air Force officers
Japanese–English translators
People associated with the University of Sussex
British people of Italian descent
20th-century British diplomats